The Kaili–Pamona languages are a branch of the Celebic subgroup in the Austronesian language family spoken in western Central Sulawesi province, Indonesia.

Languages
Per the 23rd edition of Ethnologue, languages classed under the Kaili–Pamona languages grouping include the following:

Northern
Kaili: Kaili (Ledo Kaili, Da'a Kaili, Unde Kaili, Baras), Lindu, Moma (Kulawi), Topoiyo, Sedoa
Pamona: Pamona (Bare’e), Tombelala
Southern
Rampi
Uma
Sarudu
Badaic: Bada, Behoa (Besoa), Napu

Zobel (2020) lists the Kaili–Pamona languages, which he calls Northern Kaili–Wolio, as Common Kaili, Sedoa, Kulawi, Lindu, Topoiyo, Uma, and Pamona. The Badaic languages (Bada, Besoa, and Napu) are excluded and reclassified with the Seko languages as part of the South Sulawesi branch, while Rampi is excluded as a separate branch coordinate to South Sulawesi and Celebic.

References

External links
"Kaili-Pamona" at Ethnologue (23rd ed, 2020).

 
Central Sulawesi
Celebic languages